Barmer Refinery is an upcoming public sector refinery and petrochemical complex in the  Pachpadra near Balotra in Barmer district of Rajasthan, India. It is owned by HPCL Rajasthan Refinery Limited(HRRL), a joint venture between Hindustan Petroleum Corporation Limited and the Government of Rajasthan.This refinery will be connected with Jamnagar Refinery and Bathinda Refinery through Amritsar Jamnagar Expressway.

Developments 
The government will set up petrochemicals hub near the refinery. High level infrastructure for petroleum, chemicals and petrochemicals has begun to develop near the refinery. An area of 100 sq km has been identified near the refinery to build processing unit and large industries have started.

Construction and capacity 
The foundation stones of the project were laid on 22 September 2013 by then Indian National Congress president Sonia Gandhi. The projects kick-started only after the Prime Minister Narendra Modi inaugurated the works on 16 January 2018 and was planned to be completed by 2022-23.

The project has planned capacity of 9 million tonne per year of refining capacity and 2 million tonne per year of petrochemical complex capacity. It will be spread across  of land.

The facility will have 29 process units, such as a 9 MMTPA crude distillation unit, 4.8 MMTPA vacuum distillation unit, 1.8 MMTPA naphtha hydrotreater unit, a diesel hydrotreater unit at 4.1 MMTPA, a delayed coker unit with capacity 2.4 MMTPA, vacuum gas oil hydrotreater with a capacity of 3.5 MMTPA and a fluidised catalytic cracking unit of 2.9 MMTPA. Other units include an Isomerisation unit, a dual-feed cracker unit, an ethylene recovery unit, two polyethylene units and two polypropylene units. The polypropylene units will use Lummus' Novolen process reactors and Novolen high performance catalyst.

Contractors who were selected for various units were:
 Petro Fluidised Catalytic Cracking Unit - L&T Hydrocarbon Engineering
 Dual Feed Cracker Unit - L&T Hydrocarbon Engineering
 Crude and Vacuum distillation unit (CDU-VDU) - Tata Projects
 Delayed coker unit with unsaturated LPG treating unit - Tata Projects
 Vacuum gas oil hydrotreating unit - Tata Projects

Financing and outcomes 
Barmer Refinery is owned by a joint venture between Hindustan Petroleum Corporation Limited (owning 74% stakes) and the Government of Rajasthan (owning 26% stakes). In January 2019, the project was announced to be worth . Around 66% of the finances (worth ) would be arranged through loan from joint consortium of lenders; State Bank of India being prime lender with over 50% contribution.

Hindustan Petroleum Corporation Limited managing director M. K. Surana said the project would employ 40,000 people directly and 60,000 people indirectly. More employment will be given to local people.

Rajasthan State Industrial Development and Investment Corporation will invest ₹1 lakh core in Barmar Refinery.

See also
 Barmer
 Amritsar Jamnagar Expressway

References 

Oil refineries in India
Energy in Rajasthan
Hindustan Petroleum
Hindustan Petroleum buildings and structures